At least three ships of the Hellenic Navy have borne the name Kountouriotis after Greek naval hero Pavlos Kountouriotis:

  a  launched in 1931 and decommissioned in 1946.
  a  launched in 1945 as USS Rupertus she was transferred to Greece in 1973 and renamed. She was stricken in 1995.
 , an  launched in 1976 as HNLMS Kortenaer she was transferred to Greece in 1997 and renamed.

Hellenic Navy ship names